Sheffield Steel Roller Derby (SSRD) is a flat track roller derby league based in Sheffield, South Yorkshire, England. Founded in August 2008, 

SSRD are a member of both the United Kingdom Roller Derby Association (UKRDA) and the Women's Flat Track Derby Association (WFTDA).

League Structure 
The league has over 70 members making up two competitive teams, the All Stars (A) and the Crucibelles (B). 

A number of skaters also train as a non-competitive, recreational group called the Molten Mavens. Since 2016, the league run a junior roller derby team, the Sheffield Steel Junior Rollers.

Members of the team include students, teachers, engineers and other professionals, ranging in age from late teens to mid-forties and beyond.

Sheffield Steel Roller Derby practice three times a week with extra sessions outdoors during the summer. The league is a skater-run organisation, managed by a committee of elected officers who head up sub-committees in areas such as training, media, merchandise, sponsorship and events. Officers are re-elected annually, as are the league Captain and Vice Captain.

History and organisation
Pauline Chalmers (derby name Jane Doe-a-Go-Go) established the league as Sheffield Steel Rollergirls in August 2008, after moving to the city to meet new friends and gain new experiences. After discovering roller derby online and finding that there was no team in Sheffield, she created a Myspace profile to find interested locals. 

In March 2010, the league received a £700 grant from the Sheffield Telegraph as part of the South Yorkshire Community Foundation's Grassroots Grants programme designed to fund worthwhile projects in Sheffield. This allowed the league to organise their first home bout at Ponds Forge International Sports Centre in July 2010.

On 3 September 2011 the league's B team, the Crucibelles, debuted against Newcastle Roller Girls' B team, the Whippin' Hinnies. This was a double header that also saw the All Stars play Newcastle's A Team, the Canny Belters.

Sheffield Steel Rollergirls entered the WFTDA Apprentice Program in July 2012, and became full members of the WFTDA in June 2013.

In January 2019, the league changed its name to Sheffield Steel Roller Derby as a move to reflect the inclusive nature of the league and the sport as a whole.

National Team Representation 
At the 2014 Roller Derby World Cup, Holly Hotrod (17) was part of the Team England training squad while Glenys the Menace was on the Team Wales Roller Derby squad. Erica Mitchell-Packington (She-Rarr, 242) was part of the West Indies Roller Derby squad the same year, and on their management team for the 2018 Roller Derby World Cup. Her Sheffield teammate, Madge Juicer (5), was on the West Indies squad in 2018 and Tom Pritchard was bench coach for the West Indies Roller Derby squad at both the 2014 and 2018 Roller Derby World Cups. The league's Athanasia Carghiaur (Athas' Sin, 11) was in the Romania Roller Derby squad for the 2018 Roller Derby World Cup.

WFTDA rankings 

*Please note that rankings were suspended in March 2020 in light of the COVID-19 pandemic.
 NR = no ranking assigned in this release

Early games

¹ Results from Sheffield Steel Rollergirls' view

In the media
Sheffield Steel Roller Derby have been featured in the Sheffield Telegraph, and the Sheffield Star. The SmashDance event was also mentioned in Exposed Magazine.

Sheffield Steel Rollergirls appeared on ITV1's ITV Calendar on 22 April 2010. They have also had a number of appearances on BBC Radio Sheffield.

On 10 November 2010, the team featured on BBC Online. On 4 December 2010, the team featured on BBC2 Sportsround  (repeated on CBBC on 5 December 2010) as part of an "Alternative Sports Special".

Erica Mitchell-Packington (derby name She-Rarr) featured in the documentary film On the Road to Dallas, which explores the lives and preparations of a group of roller derby players as they get ready for the Roller Derby World Cup.

In the community
On 9 April 2010, Sheffield Steel Rollergirls took part in the Showroom Cinema's premiere of Whip It. Ten members of the league completed the Goodwood Roller Marathon in August 2010, raising over £1,200 for the Sheffield Children's Hospital.  A group of skaters from the team completed the 2011 Goodwood Marathon for the NSPCC and the Bluebell Wood Children's Hospice in Sheffield. More recent charity events have concentrated on raising awareness and donations for The Homeless Period.

References

External links
 Sheffield Steel Rollergirls Bout Photos
 A Team results on Flat Track Stats
 Crucibelles results on Flat Track Stats

Roller derby in England
Roller derby leagues in the United Kingdom
Women's sports teams in England
Roller derby leagues established in 2008
Sports teams and clubs in Sheffield
Women's Flat Track Derby Association Division 3
2008 establishments in England